A partial lunar eclipse took place on Sunday, April 12, 1903. This nearly total lunar eclipse of Saros cycle 130 preceded the first total eclipse on April 22, 1921. The Moon was almost covered by the Earth's shadow in a very deep partial eclipse, which lasted 3 hours and 17 minutes. With 96.77% of the Moon in shadow at maximum eclipse, this was quite a memorable event.

Visibility

Related lunar eclipses

Saros series

Half-Saros cycle
A lunar eclipse will be preceded and followed by solar eclipses by 9 years and 5.5 days (a half saros). This lunar eclipse is related to two hybrid solar eclipses of Solar Saros 137 (1 hybrid solar eclipse after 1901).

See also
List of lunar eclipses
List of 20th-century lunar eclipses

Notes

External links

1903-04
1903 in science